Trimilinda was a town of ancient Lycia, which per the Stadiasmus Patarensis was on a road from Balbura to Kibyra.
 
Its site is unlocated.

References

Populated places in ancient Lycia
Former populated places in Turkey
Lost ancient cities and towns